Nathan Brody is an American psychology professor Emeritus known for his work on intelligence and personality.

Brody received his BA from University of New Hampshire and his MA and PhD from University of Michigan. He taught at Wesleyan University and is currently an emeritus professor there.

In 1995, Brody was part of an 11-member American Psychological Association task force led by Ulric Neisser which published Intelligence: Knowns and Unknowns, a report written in response to The Bell Curve. In 1998, he was one of the contributors to the 1998 special issue devoted to Arthur Jensen in Intelligence, where he praised Jensen's work as a "formidable contribution" to the topic of race and intelligence, though disagreeing to some extent with them.

Publications
 Brody N. Human Motivation: Commentary on Goal-Directed Action. Academic Press (July 1, 1983) .
 Brody N. Personality: research and theory. Academic Press (1972) 
 Brody N. Personality: In Search of Individuality. Academic Press (March 28, 1988) .
 Brody N. Intelligence. Academic Press; 2 edition (March 20, 1992, first edition 1976) .
 Brody N, Ehrlichman H. Personality Psychology: Science of Individuality. Prentice Hall; 1 edition (August 12, 1997) .

References

External links
Nathan Brody profile via Wesleyan University

Living people
21st-century American psychologists
Wesleyan University faculty
Year of birth missing (living people)
University of Michigan alumni
University of New Hampshire alumni